HMS Camellia was a  that served in the Royal Navy.

She was laid down on 14 November 1939, launched on 4 May 1940, and commissioned on 18 June 1940.

Operational service
In January 1941 Camelia served as a rescue transport for five crewman of the merchant ship Ringhorn which had gone down in stormy weather. On 7 March 1941, serving as escorts for convoy OB 293 escort south-east of Iceland, Camellia and her sister ship  sank the German submarine .

Fate

In 1948 she was sold for commercial service and renamed Hetty W Vinke.

References

Publications

External links
HMS Camellia on the Arnold Hague database at convoyweb.org.uk.
HMS Camellia at uboat.net

Flower-class corvettes of the Royal Navy
1940 ships
Ships built by Harland and Wolff